Down and Out in Purgatory: The Collected Stories of Tim Powers is a collection of fantasy and science fiction short stories by Tim Powers. It was first published in hardcover and ebook editions by Baen Books in November 2017.

Summary
The book collects twenty novellas, novelettes and short stories by the author, three of them written in collaboration with James P. Blaylock, together with a foreword by David Drake and an introduction by Tony Daniel.

Contents
"Foreword: Paths Through Dark Woods" (David Drake)
"Introduction: The Powers Effect" (Tony Daniel)
"Salvage and Demolition" (first published as separate chapbook, 2013)
"The Bible Repairman" (first published as separate chapbook, 2006)
"Appointment at Sunset" (first published as separate chapbook, 2014)
"The Better Boy" (with James P. Blaylock) (from Isaac Asimov's Science Fiction Magazine, February 1991)
"Pat Moore" (from Flights: Extreme Visions of Fantasy, 2004)
"The Way Down the Hill" (from The Magazine of Fantasy & Science Fiction, December 1982)
"Itinerary" (from 999, 1999)
"A Journey of Only Two Paces" (from The Bible Repairman and Other Stories, 2011)
"The Hour of Babel" (from Subterranean: Tales of Dark Fantasy, 2008)
"Where They Are Hid" (first published as separate chapbook, 1995)
"We Traverse Afar" (with James P. Blaylock) (from Christmas Forever, 1993)
"Through and Through" (from The Devils in the Details, 2003)
"Night Moves" (first published as separate chapbook, 1986)
"A Soul in a Bottle" (first published as separate chapbook, 2006)
"Parallel Lines" (from Stories, 2010)
"Fifty Cents" (with James P. Blaylock) (from The Devils in the Details, 2003)
"Nobody's Home: An Anubis Gates Story" (first published as separate chapbook, 2014)
"A Time to Cast Away Stones" (first published as separate chapbook, 2009)
"Down and Out in Purgatory" (first published as separate chapbook, 2016)
"Sufficient Unto the Day" (from Baen.com, October 2017)

Reception
Becky Spratford in Booklist calls the book as a " a treat for fans and newbies alike; hand it to readers who enjoy genre-blending authors as varied as Jim Butcher, Dean Koontz and China Miéville."

Notes

2017 short story collections
Collections by Tim Powers
Science fiction short story collections
Fantasy short story collections
Baen Books books